Simone Gesi (born 23 May 2001) is an Italian rugby union player, currently playing for United Rugby Championship side Zebre Parma. His preferred position is wing.  

He made his debut in the same match, starting on the wing.

In 2021 Gesi was named in Italy U20s squad for the annual Six Nations Under 20s Championship. On the 14 October 2021, he was selected by Alessandro Troncon to be part of an Italy A 28-man squad and on 8 December he was named in Emerging Italy 27-man squad also for the 2021 end-of-year rugby union internationals.
On the 8th March 2023, he was selected by Kieran Crowley to be part of an Italy squad for the 2023 Six Nations Championship. He made his debut against Scotland in the last match.

References

2001 births
Living people
Italian rugby union players
Rugby Colorno players
Zebre Parma players
Rugby union wings
Italy international rugby union players